Daymer Bay is a bay and a beach on the east side of the River Camel estuary in north Cornwall, England, United Kingdom. It is situated approximately six miles (10 km) north of Wadebridge.

The bay is bounded to the north by Trebetherick Point and to the south by Brea Hill.

Daymer Bay beach is backed by dunes and behind them is St Enodoc's Church where the poet John Betjeman is buried. The beach is very popular for windsurfing and kitesurfing.

References

Beaches of Cornwall
Bays of Cornwall
Populated coastal places in Cornwall